Baraveli Kandu is the channel between Noonu Atoll, Lhaviyani Atoll; Noonu Atoll and Raa Atoll of the Maldives.

References
 Divehiraajjege Jōgrafīge Vanavaru. Muhammadu Ibrahim Lutfee. G.Sōsanī.

Channels of the Maldives
Channels of the Indian Ocean